Kattarian is a small village situated 36 km to the southwest of Rawalpindi City in the Punjab province of Pakistan with a population of 2,500. It has a history of about 150 years. The main road is Chak Beli Khan road. The link road which connects to it is Nakraalil/Bagh Sangrain Road. Main bus stop is Piyal and Jhatta Hathial.

References

Populated places in Rawalpindi District